Anthony Price (born January 5, 1957) is a former professional basketball player who played in the NBA. Price attended the University of Pennsylvania where he was a standout basketball player. In his senior season, Price won the Ivy League Men's Basketball Player of the Year award after averaging 19.8 points per game and 8.7 rebounds per game. Price was then drafted with the seventh pick in the second round of the 1979 NBA Draft by the Detroit Pistons. He was waived by the Pistons before playing a single game for them. Price did end up being signed by the San Diego Clippers who he played five games for in the 1980-81 NBA season. In those five games, Price averaged 0.8 points per game and 0.6 assists per game.

Tony Price is also the father of NBA player A. J. Price.

References

External links
 

1957 births
Living people
American men's basketball players
Basketball players from New York City
Detroit Pistons draft picks
Penn Quakers men's basketball players
San Diego Clippers players
Shooting guards
Sportspeople from the Bronx